The 1876 United States presidential election in Mississippi took place on November 7, 1876, as part of the 1876 United States presidential election. Mississippi voters chose eight representatives, or electors, to the Electoral College, who voted for president and vice president.

Mississippi was won by Samuel J. Tilden, the former governor of New York (D–New York), running with Thomas A. Hendricks, the governor of Indiana and future vice president, with 68.08% of the popular vote, against Rutherford B. Hayes, the governor of Ohio (R-Ohio), running with Representative William A. Wheeler, with 31.92% of the vote. This election marked the beginning of an 18-election, or 68-year streak of the state voting heavily Democratic, which would ultimately end when Strom Thurmond of the States' Rights Democratic Party won the state in a landslide in 1948.

Results

References 

Mississippi
1876
1876 Mississippi elections